"UP! (Beat The Pussy Up)" is the debut single by American hip hop recording artist LoveRance, featuring vocals from recording artists Iamsu! and Skipper P. The song was produced by Iamsu!. The official remix features rapper 50 Cent.

The artwork for the single's cover is inspired by the promotional artwork from the 1993 film Poetic Justice.

Music video 
On June 30, 2011 LoveRance uploaded the video for "UP! (Beat The Pussy Up)" on his YouTube and Vevo account.

Track listing 
Download digital
UP! (featuring 50 Cent) — 3:51

Download digital
UP! (featuring Iamsu! and Skipper) — 4:10

Charts

Weekly charts

Year-end charts

Certifications

References 

2011 singles
2011 songs
50 Cent songs
Iamsu! songs
Songs written by 50 Cent
Interscope Records singles
Dirty rap songs